Bošnjaković is a family name found in Bosnia and Herzegovina, Croatia and Serbia. It may refer to:

Dražen Bošnjaković (born 1961), Croatia's Minister of Justice 2010–2011
Branko Bošnjaković (born 1939), Dutch-Croatian physicist, son of Fran Bošnjaković
Fran Bošnjaković (1902–1993), Croatian engineer
Milenko Bošnjaković (born 1968), Bosnian football manager

See also
Bošnjak (surname)

Croatian surnames
Serbian surnames
Toponymic surnames
Bosnian surnames
Patronymic surnames